Sudden Mischief is the 25th book in Robert B. Parker's  Spenser series and first published in 1998.

Spenser investigates sexual harassment charges against Susan Silverman's ex-husband.

References

Spenser (novel series)